Maybe We're Making God Sad and Lonely is the second full length by Dreamend, a Chicago-based band.

Track listing
 "A Place in Thy Memory" – 8:47
 "In Her Little Bed We Lay Her" – 5:02
 "Can't Take You {Dif}" – 4:10
 "Iceland" – 5:21
 "Mary Cogswell & Fred Vaillancourt" – 1:39
 "New Zealand" – 10:02

2005 albums
Dreamend albums
Graveface Records albums